Mitch Barnhart (born August 27, 1959) is the athletics director for the Kentucky Wildcats athletics program at the University of Kentucky in Lexington, Kentucky. Barnhart was hired by the university in 2002 succeeding Larry Ivy. Barnhart served in the same capacity at Oregon State University from 1998 to 2002. He is the university's tenth athletics director. In March 2016 Barnhart signed an extension on his contract which will keep him at Kentucky until 2022.

Education
Barnhart received his Bachelor of Arts from Ottawa University and a Master of Science in sports administration from Ohio University.

Tenure at Kentucky
Barnhart is currently the longest serving AD in the SEC.  For the 2016–17 school year, Kentucky athletics finished 10th nationally in the NACDA Directors' Cup, more than 100 student-athletes graduating, and finishing five straight years with an average GPA of over 3.0.

As of 2017, several coaches and administrators who have worked under Barnhart at Kentucky are now serving as athletic directors at other universities, including:
Greg Byrne of Alabama
Mark Coyle at Minnesota
Rob Mullens at Oregon
Scott Stricklin at Florida
John Cohen at Auburn
DeWayne Peevy at DePaul
Kevin Saal at Wichita State
Barnhart was inducted into Omicron Delta Kappa - The National Leadership Honor Society at the University of Kentucky in 2017.

References

External links
 Kentucky profile

1959 births
Living people
Kentucky Wildcats athletic directors
Oregon State Beavers athletic directors
Ottawa University alumni